Stephen Ayidiya (born May 1, 1951) is a Ghanaian politician and a member of the First Parliament of the Fourth Republic representing the Chiana-Paga Constituency in the Upper East Region of Ghana. He represented the National Democratic Congress.

Early life and education 
Ayidiya was born on the 1 May 1952 in the Upper East Region of Ghana. He attended the Notre Dame Seminary Senior High School, Navrongo, the University of Ghana  and the University of Akron where he obtained a Doctor of Philosophy.

Politics 
Ayidiya was first elected into Parliament on the ticket of the National Democratic Congress (NDC) during the 1992 Ghanaian parliamentary election to represent the Chiana-Paga Constituency in the Upper East Region of Ghana. He was succeeded by Abugu Pele during the NDC Parliamentary Primaries. Pele polled 19,362 votes out of the total valid votes cast representing 48.20% during the 1996 Ghanaian general election over his opponent Achinan Apiyese James of the Convention People's Party.

Career 
Ayidiya is a University Lecturer by profession and a former member of parliament for the Chiana-Paga Constituency  in the Upper East Region of Ghana.

Personal life 
He is a Christian.

References 

Living people
1951 births
National Democratic Congress (Ghana) politicians
University of Ghana alumni
University of Akron alumni
Lecturers
Ghanaian Christians
Ghanaian MPs 1993–1997
People from Upper East Region